Dennis Desrosiers (born March 28, 1949) is a Canadian former professional ice hockey player and coach. He played 13 professional seasons, mostly in the International Hockey League (IHL) where he played 532 games, scoring 312 goals and 277 points for 589 points, and earning 1690 penalty minutes. Following his retirement as a player, Desrosiers spent the next 18 seasons a head coach in the IHL, ECHL, UHL and OHL. He was then Saginaw Spirit's radio colour commentator from 2004-2012.

Playing career
Desrosiers began his professional career in 1970 with the Clinton Comets of the Eastern Hockey League where he played two seasons before joining the Saginaw Gears of the International Hockey League (IHL) for their inaugural 1972-73 season. With the exception of 28 games played in the American Hockey League with the New Haven Nighthawks during the 1973–74 season, Desrosiers remained with the Gears until the 1981–82 season when he joined the Flint Generals, first as a player and then, beginning with the 1983–84 season, as Flint's head coach.

Coaching career
After two seasons as the head coach for the Flint Generals, Desrosiers was hired as the head coach for the Saginaw Generals starting with the 1985–86 season, leaving after two seasons to become the head coach for the Cincinnati Cyclones of the IHL. He continued as a head coach with the Birmingham Bulls (1996-2000) and the Kalamazoo Wings (2000-2002), before returning to Saginaw in 2002 to be named as the first head coach for the Saginaw Spirit of the Ontario Hockey League.

Broadcasting career
In 2004, after two seasons as the Spirit's head coach, Desrosiers joined the Saginaw Spirit radio broadcast team as the colour commentator, a position he held until 2012 when he left the team to relocate to North Carolina. He returned in 2014 to the radio booth after a two-year absence.

Awards and honours
In 2006, Desrosiers was inducted into the Saginaw County Sports Hall of Fame.

References

External links

1949 births
Living people
Canadian ice hockey coaches
Canadian ice hockey right wingers
Clinton Comets players
Flint Generals players
New Haven Nighthawks players
Saginaw Gears players
Sportspeople from Kirkland Lake
Ice hockey people from Ontario
Canadian expatriate ice hockey players in the United States